Menotti Pozzacchio (9 December 1906 – 16 July 1974) was a Luxembourgian weightlifter. He competed in the men's lightweight event at the 1928 Summer Olympics.

References

1906 births
1974 deaths
Luxembourgian male weightlifters
Olympic weightlifters of Luxembourg
Weightlifters at the 1928 Summer Olympics
People from Differdange